The 2014 Barnsley Metropolitan Borough Council election took place on 22 May 2014 to elect members of Barnsley Metropolitan Borough Council in England. This was on the same day as other local elections.

By-elections between 2014 and 2015

References

2014 English local elections
2014
2010s in South Yorkshire